

Rum balls are a truffle-like confectionery cake of cookie butter flavoured with chocolate and rum. They are roughly the size of a golf ball and often coated in chocolate sprinkles, desiccated coconut, or cocoa. As their name implies, these cookies contain rum. Because they are not baked, the alcohol flavour and kick are not neutralized during preparation. This cookie is especially popular during the holiday season.

Rum balls are a popular Christmas treat in England, Australia, Canada, Germany, New Zealand, the United States, Austria, Slovenia, Hungary, Greece and the Czech Republic. In Denmark they are enjoyed year round and known as either romkugle, trøffel or sputnik, depending on the specific region.

There are many different ways to make rum balls, as recipes vary from region to region and family to family. All rum balls must include chocolate and rum, but the rest of the ingredients vary in kind, form, and amount.

To make rum balls, the cake (or biscuit) material is crushed and mixed with fat, cocoa and a moist binding ingredient, such as jam or condensed milk. Other optional ingredients can also be added, such as nuts. When the mixture holds together firmly, it is rolled into balls and then coated.

In Hungary they are made in a similar way, but usually rolled in sugar. Ground walnut and raisins are sometimes added to the rum ball ingredients. Some Hungarian rum balls are made with whole cherries placed inside the balls, and then rolled in coconut flakes.

Rum balls closely resemble brigadeiros, a Brazilian sweet; however, brigadeiros are made from condensed milk.

The world's largest rum ball was created in Mejdal, Denmark on 11 June 2017, weighing .

See also
 Bourbon ball
 Brigadeiro
 Chokladboll
 Chocolate truffle

References

Further reading
 Lovegren, Sylvia. Fashionable Food: Seven Decades of Food Fads. New York: Macmillan, 1995. .

External links

 How to Make Cruzan Rum Balls

Australian confectionery
Austrian confectionery
Christmas food
Danish confectionery
German confectionery
New Zealand confectionery
Hungarian desserts
Chocolate desserts
Cakes
Cookies